Kabba Sambou (born 20 April 1996) is a Gambian professional footballer who plays as a midfielder for Championnat National 2 club Bourges.

Club career
Born in Manjai Kunda, Sambou has played club football for Banjul Hawks, Stade de Mbour, Trepça'89, Skënderbeu Korçë and Samtredia.

International career 
Sambou made his international debut for the Gambia in 2015.

References

1996 births
Living people
Gambian footballers
The Gambia international footballers
Banjul Hawks FC players
Stade de Mbour players
KF Trepça'89 players
KF Skënderbeu Korçë players
FC Samtredia players
Bourges Foot 18 players
Kategoria Superiore players
Erovnuli Liga players
Championnat National 2 players
Championnat National 3 players
Association football midfielders
Gambian expatriate footballers
Gambian expatriate sportspeople in Senegal
Expatriate footballers in Senegal
Gambian expatriate sportspeople in Kosovo
Expatriate footballers in Kosovo
Gambian expatriate sportspeople in Albania
Expatriate footballers in Albania
Expatriate footballers in France
Gambian expatriate sportspeople in Georgia (country)
Expatriate footballers in Georgia (country)

Gambian expatriate sportspeople in France